Manuel Klinge (born 5 September 1984) is a German professional ice hockey right wing currently playing for Kassel Huskies of the DEL2. Klinge started playing for his hometown team the Kassel Huskies, making his professional debut with the team in 2003 and stayed with the team until they went bankrupt in 2010. He then joined DEL top team Adler Mannheim. After just one season, he surprisingly moved back to Kassel, now in the third division, starting an apprenticeship next to playing ice hockey.

Klinge played for the German national team at the 2010 Winter Olympics.

Career statistics

Regular season and playoffs

Source:

International

References

External links

1984 births
Adler Mannheim players
German ice hockey right wingers
Ice hockey players at the 2010 Winter Olympics
Kassel Huskies players
Living people
Olympic ice hockey players of Germany
Sportspeople from Kassel